James Lee Wong, known simply as Mr. Wong, is a fictional Chinese-American detective created by Hugh Wiley (1884–1968). Mr. Wong appeared in twenty magazine stories and a film series of six, the first five of which starred English actor Boris Karloff as Wong, the last with Chinese-American actor Keye Luke in the role, the first Asian lead.

Description
In his story "No Witnesses", Wiley describes Mr. Wong as six feet tall, educated at Yale University and "with the face of a foreign devil-a Yankee". In the stories he is an agent of the United States Treasury Department and lives in San Francisco.

Short stories

Films
The Mr. Wong character was featured in a series of films for Monogram Pictures. The first five starred Boris Karloff and directed by William Nigh. All the films co-starred Grant Withers as Wong's friend, Police Captain Street. Karloff also played the Chinese character Dr. Fu Manchu in The Mask of Fu Manchu (1932) and General Wu Yen Fang, in West of Shanghai (1937), just prior to the first Mr. Wong. There is also an unrelated 1934 "Mr. Wong" film starring Bela Lugosi featuring a title character named Mr. Fu Wong, a criminal mastermind, The Mysterious Mr. Wong.

The sixth film featured Chinese-American actor Keye Luke in the title role, the first time an American sound film used an Asian actor to play a lead Asian detective. Luke had formerly played one of Charlie Chan's sons in the Chan mysteries and Kato in The Green Hornet 1939 serial. In the reboot of the Mr. Wong series, the young "Jimmy Wong" (Luke) was introduced to Police Captain Street, whom Karloff's character worked with in the previous films. A 1940 article, Keye Luke Sleuths on his Own, in the Hollywood Citizen News, announced that Luke had been signed for four Mr. Wong pictures a year. However, due to Karloff's departure, exhibitors lost interest and the series ended.

Comics
From 1939 a comic of the film The Mystery of Mr Wong appeared in four consecutive issues of Popular Comics.

Popular Comics (Dell, 1939–40)
Issues 38-41

Notes

See also

Portrayal of East Asians in Hollywood
Charlie Chan
Mr. Moto

External links

James Lee Wong at Thrilling Detective
Mr. Wong at seriesbooks.info

American film series
Fictional characters from San Francisco
Fictional characters introduced in 1934
Fictional Chinese American people
Fictional Chinese people in literature
Fictional detectives
Fictional Yale University people